Ministry of Lands may refer to:
 Ministry of Lands and Parliamentary Reforms (Sri Lanka)
 Ministry of Lands and Natural Resources (Zambia)